Hank Smith may refer to:

Hank Smith (animator), American animator
Hank A. Smith (1893–1985), American football player
Hank Smith (singer) (1934–2002), Canadian country music singer
Hank Smith (speaker), Motivational Speaker and Trainer

See also
 Harry Smith (disambiguation)
 Hal Smith (disambiguation)
 Henry Smyth (disambiguation)